Armstrong and Miller are a British comedy double act.

Armstrong and Miller may also refer to:

Armstrong and Miller (TV series), Paramount Comedy and Channel 4 television comedy sketch series, later retitled The Armstrong and Miller Show
Armstrong and Miller (radio show), radio comedy sketch show

See also 
 The Armstrong & Miller Show, BBC television comedy sketch series

δ